The canton of Vivonne is an administrative division of the Vienne department, western France. Its borders were modified at the French canton reorganisation which came into effect in March 2015. Its seat is in Vivonne.

It consists of the following communes:
 
Aslonnes
Château-Larcher
Dienné
Fleuré
Gizay
Iteuil
Marçay
Marigny-Chemereau
Marnay
Nieuil-l'Espoir
Nouaillé-Maupertuis
Roches-Prémarie-Andillé
Smarves
Vernon
La Villedieu-du-Clain
Vivonne

References

Cantons of Vienne